Beaks of Crows is the fourth EP by Australian singer-songwriter Josh Pyke. It was released in July 2007 on Ivy League Records. It features a live version of the song "Fill You In", recorded at the Wesley Anne in Northcote, Melbourne.

Track listing

References

2007 EPs
Josh Pyke albums
Ivy League Records EPs